is a 2008 Japanese drama film directed by  Yuichiro Hirakawa.

Cast
Junichi Okada
Aoi Miyazaki
Atsushi Itō
Aya Hirayama
Tamaki Ogawa
Takashi Tsukamoto
Toshiyuki Nishida
Tomokazu Miura
Toshie Negishi
Kami Hiraiwa
Tomoko Ikuta

Reception
The film grossed ¥1.95 billion in Japan.

References

External links

2008 drama films
2008 films
Films based on Japanese novels
Japanese drama films
2000s Japanese films